The 2022 CCHA Men's Ice Hockey Tournament was the 43rd tournament in the history of the men's Central Collegiate Hockey Association. The first tournament held after the revival of the conference, it began on March 4 and ended on March 19, 2022. All games were played at home campus sites. Minnesota State won the tournament and received the CCHA's automatic bid for the 2022 NCAA Division I Men's Ice Hockey Tournament.

Format
The first round of the postseason tournament features a best-of-three games format, while the semifinals and final are single games held at the campus sites of the highest remaining seeds. All eight conference teams participated in the tournament. Teams are seeded No. 1 through No. 8 according to their final conference standings, with a tiebreaker system used to seed teams with an identical number of points accumulated. The higher-seeded teams each earned home ice and hosted one of the lower-seeded teams. The teams that advance out of the quarterfinals are reseeded according to the regular season standings. The semifinals and final are single-elimination games. The winners of the semifinals play one another to determine the conference tournament champion.

Conference standings

Bracket

Note: * denotes overtime periods

Results
Note: All game times are local.

Quarterfinals

(1) Minnesota State vs. (8) St. Thomas

(2) Michigan Tech vs. (7) Ferris State

(3) Bemidji State vs. (6) Bowling Green

(4) Lake Superior State vs. (5) Northern Michigan

Semifinals

(1) Minnesota State vs. (5) Northern Michigan

(2) Michigan Tech vs. (3) Bemidji State

Championship

(1) Minnesota State vs. (3) Bemidji State

Tournament awards

Most Valuable Player

References

CCHA Men's Ice Hockey Tournament
CCHA Men's Ice Hockey Tournament
CCHA Tournament